Richard Barningham was an English academic  during the 16th-century: he was  Master of Balliol from 1504 to 1511.

Notes

16th-century English people
Masters of Balliol College, Oxford